Rasa Von Werder (also known as Kellie Everts; born Rasa Sofija Jakstas, July 16, 1945) is a German author, former stripper, female bodybuilder, photographer, evangelist, mystic, contemplative, and founder of a church. She understands both Christianity and Yoga. She believes her Mission is to empower women, and to restore the worship of God as Mother.

Personal life
Kellie Everts, originally named as Rasa Sofija Jakstas, was born on July 16, 1945 in Calw, Baden-Württemberg, Germany. Her Lithuanian parents, Stasys and Regina Jakstas, had fled from Lithuania (then part of the Soviet Union) under Stalin. The family ended up in a displaced persons camp, and in 1949 boarded the Navy ship USS Heintzelman bound for the US.

Kellie’s parents were sponsored to stay in an ethnic community in Newark, New Jersey. Her father, a professor, created a Lithuanian school in the Church’s auditorium, on the heels of founding the first State Teacher's College in Kaunas, Lithuania.

None of Kellie’s family spoke English when they first moved to New Jersey. At the age 5, Kellie was moved ahead a grade because of her artistic talents. She was considered a child prodigy. Her drawings were put into a children's gallery, and a Christmas card she drew at age 6 was mimeographed and hundreds of copies were distributed.  

After emigrating to the US, Kellie lived in several places in New Jersey and New York. She suffered mental and emotional abuse from her mother. Whenever Kellie got jobs, her mother would call up and have her fired. She was deprived of money for necessities like clothes and dental care. She was verbally abused and was told that she was unattractive and valueless. Upon leaving home, Kellie struggled to prove herself.

After her parents separated, she then moved to Williamsburg, Brooklyn, to live with her father. A month after finishing high school she ran away with the famous photographer of Marilyn Monroe, to Hollywood, CA, where she began her career in show business. She lived in Santa Monica next to the pier, where she married Stanley Everts in 1963 and had a daughter, also named Kellie. She later lived in the Pacific Palisades, then Beverly Hills, and then finally Hollywood itself. Stanley Everts passed away in 1966.

After ten years of living in California, she returned to Williamsburg, Brooklyn, where she spent 17 years total, from 1972 to 1989. There, Kellie started a successful business and managed to acquire 200k in savings, which she used to buy a house in Upstate New York, where she has lived ever since.

She married Richard Allan Von Werder in 2000 after being engaged since 1986, and they remained married until his death in 2002.

Her house in the Catskills area has a paradise-like property with 50 acres, a 5 acre island, 500 feet of riverfront, forests, fields, a swamp, creeks and a pond. According to Everts, God showed her which property to buy in a dream and said to her, "Go – I have a house for one of my deserving poor – you will be rich." They later found natural gas and oil under the property. 

Upon her death, Rasa ultimately plans to leave her property and all her money for a Sisterhood that will have a "Temple to Mother God", and convent for women who will conduct research and promotion for the general cause of Matriarchy. Her goal is to have this Sisterhood continue her work on the "New Religion for Women" that she founded, and send it out worldwide.

Stasys Jakstas (1906-1979), a Lithuanian teacher, poet, and editor, was her father.

Career

Bodybuilding and stripping
Everts was effectively the founder of female bodybuilding; prior to her it was extremely rare for women to do so. She first began competing in various bodybuilding contests in the NYC area in 1972. It was after her promotion, Esquire 6 page layout in July 1975 and then being on "To Tell the Truth", as well as the Mike Douglas Show and The Stanley Siegel Show, and subsequently getting female body building into Playboy, May 1977 (Humping Iron) that anyone began to hold serious female fitness and body building contests. The first was in 1979, IFBB Miss Fitness, and the next was the IFBB 1980 Ms. Olympia. She promoted the idea to get it accepted, and from 1975 to 1977 she was the only one notably promoting it. After those first two contests, many more were held. Hundreds of women began to train and enter contests, then thousands. She explains this further in one of her many books, The Origin & Decline of Female Body Building (2011), and also in her 2019 interview with David Robson.

She trained for the 1981 competition but was barred from entering the Caesar's Palace Boardwalk Regency IFBB competition in Atlantic City. However, by then she had already accomplished her goal of promoting bodybuilding for women, having laid the groundwork for it several years prior.

On February 2, 2007, the World Bodybuilding Guild (WBBG) awarded her "Progenitor" of Female Bodybuilding and in August 2007 inducted her into their Hall of Fame.

The Stripper for God
Initially, Rasa had won the titles of Miss Nude Universe in July 1967, Miss Americana 2nd place and Best Body in 1972 (on the same stage with Arnold Schwarzenegger), Miss Body Beautiful 2nd place in 1973, Miss Body Beautiful U.S.A. first place in 1974, and Miss Americana 2nd place & Best Body 1974 (the same stage with Arnold Schwarzenegger again). She made nine appearances in Playboy. She first appeared as Miss Nude Universe, hers was the first female body builder as "Humping Iron", May 1977, predating Lisa Lyon's appearance by three years. She had two pages of pictures on her "Stripping for God" in Playboy. Her dancing career went from March 1966 to August 1987, dancing coast to coast and all over Canada as well. She then quit to become a producer of her dancing and female domination videos, making enough money to purchase a large property with island in Upstate New York in 1989, where she has lived ever since.

Ministry
In September 1973, Everts gave her first spiritual talk (prior to dancing) at the Melody Theater in Times Square as a religious minister. The combination of stripper and spiritual religious conviction led to the creation of what the press called the "Stripper for God".

The "Stripping for God" created an obvious controversy about the idea of being both sexual and spiritual at the same time, as opposed to only one or the other, due to the prevailing social norms and constructs. Likewise, by extension the related concept of being both a person of God and also in the adult trade at the same time was controversial as well.

Everts traveled in the United States and Canada, giving over 1,000 sermons in burlesque theaters and nightclubs.

She also travelled several times to Canada, and made one trip to the United Kingdom In 1988, she notably appeared on The Morton Downey Jr. Show. 
As a result of the blatant and outrageous mistreatment of her on the show by the host Morton Downey Jr., Everts had filed a libel lawsuit against both Downey as well as the television network on which the show was aired, WWOR-TV.

Everts has also done much activism, humanitarian, and community work as well, primarily in Brooklyn, New York.

Everts later changed the emphasis of her mission to the return of matriarchy and the feminine divine. On June 16, 1978, she preached on the message of Our Lady of Fátima in front of the White House, with the aim of bringing about the conversion of Russia and, by extension, preventing a potential nuclear World War III. The gist of the message was, "Pray the Rosary for the conversion of Russia, or nations will be annihilated."

Since shifting her focus, she then founded her own church, The University of Mother God Church, which later evolved further into a new religion specifically for women.

As a guru of the new religious movement she founded, many of her followers believe she is an Avatar, or an incarnation of God, much like Ramakrishna.

Her spiritual beliefs are that she was sent by God to help humanity, primarily via female empowerment and then ultimately matriarchy, which she believes is the only hope for humanity and solving the world's problems. Her goal is to restore the worship of God as Mother, and female leadership in all areas of life including spirituality, in order to attain a world of biophilia, that is, life and love.

Author

On May 24, 2004, Everts, under her present name Rasa Von Werder or Guru Rasa of the Church of MotherGod, started the Woman Thou Art God Website. She has since continued publishing online on her religious beliefs, and has thirty-six (and counting) books published on female empowerment, her biography, matriarchy spirituality and various other subjects, many available on both Amazon and Lulu. Since 2014, Rasa has also had another main website as well, Embodiment of God, that further builds upon the first one.
She has also collaborated with other authors as well in writing books and online articles, most notably including William Bond, who is also featured on that site.

Later years

In her later years, after 30 years of celibacy for spiritual purposes, beginning age 63 in 2008 (according to her, God told her to stop suffering, quit celibacy and have fun – thus it was "the Will of God"), Rasa became a "cougar" and photographer of males, largely in the college town of Binghamton, New York, for the purpose of furthering the cause of female empowerment. At Binghamton University, she was a big hit overall, featured several times on the front page of their student newspaper. She has written about this experience in several books (see Bibliography section).

Rasa has also further expanded upon her new matriarchal religion for women, writing the book Woman, Thou Art God: The New Religion for Women in 2019-2020, and is currently working on several other books from 2021–2023. These include further volumes in her autobiographical I Strip For God book series, as well as books containing all the guidelines, directions, doctrine, and suggestions for her Sisterhood and "New Religion for Women" that she founded.

Filmography

Film
 "She Did It His Way" (1968)
 "The Girls on F Street" (1967)
 "Dude Ranch" (1966–1968)
 "The Swinger" (1966)

Television
England documentary on people starting their own YouTube videos, and her dancing (2008)
 The Morton Downey Jr. Show (1988)
National: Entertainment Tonight regarding the Morton Downey Jr. Show (1988)
People Are Talking (1988, multiple times)
The Sally Jessy Rafael Show (1988)
Various international documentaries, including 60 Minutes Australia (1988) – and also appeared on shows & documentaries in Italy as well.
Geraldo (1987)
Phil Donahue (1987)
Regis Philbin & Kathie Lee (1986)
San Francisco News (1984)
Detroit TV (WXYZ Detroit) (1982)
Tom Snyder (twice) – 1976 & 1981 – 1976 as ‘Stripper for God', and 1981 as Body Builder with Lisa Lyon, where Rasa spoke & posed in a white bikini
To Tell The Truth (twice) – once as impersonating the "World's Yo Yo Champion" and second, as herself, minister and body builder doing some bench presses at the end (1978)
Chicago: Warren Saunders' Common Ground (1978)
Chicago – Ron Hunter Show (1978)
AM Chicago (1978)
Chicago – Friday Night Live with Jay Levene (1978)
AM Washington (twice, 1974 and 1978)
Inside Edition (Florida) (1978)
The Bill Boggs Show (1976)
Real People (5 times total) for all that she did – Stripper for God, Body Builder (1975-1981)
Mike Douglas (1975)
AM New York (many times, including once with Arnold Schwarzenegger) (1974)
And various other TV news shows (many coast to coast in the US as well as in Canada) from 1972 to 2017, for her various activities, Stripping for God, Body Building, getting arrested in Ohio and Toronto, and her new church

Other video appearances

 "Kellie Everts 48-28-38 Conducts Night Train", various videos on YouTube (2018–2019)
 "Army of Mother God", by Female Supremacy NOW, on YouTube (2015)

In popular culture
As a result of her influence, Werder has made numerous appearances in numerous forms of magazine prints. Including The New York Post (1974), D-Cup (1989), The Examiner, The Sun (1998) and has frequently been portrayed on Playboy.

Bibliography
I Strip for God, part 9 (2022)
I Strip for God, part 8 (2022)
I Strip for God, part 7 (2022)
I Strip for God, part 6 (2022)
I Strip for God, part 5 (2021)
I Strip for God, part 4 (2021)
I Strip for God, part 3 (2021)
I Strip for God, part 2 (2021)
Woman, Thou Art God: The New Religion for Women (2020)
America's Most Beautiful Men (2019)
Old Woman, Young Man: Why They Belong Together, Part II (2019)
America's Most Beautiful Man (2016)
Old Woman, Young Man: Why They Belong Together, Part I (2011)
Theater of the Mind: Dreams, Symbols, & Meanings (2011)
Guru Rasa and her Devotees (2011 and 2009)
Secrets of Yoga and Christianity: Are They Compatible? (2011 and 2006)
The Beatific Vision: Seeing God Face to Face (2011 and 2009)
Theater of Justice: Celebrity Souls Appear (2011 and 2007)
The Future of Male-Female Relationships (2011 and 2009)
On the Attainment of the Divine Stigmata (2011)
Worship of Beautiful Women Is Hunger for Mother God (2011 and 2009)
Breastfeeding Is Lovemaking Between Mother and Child (2011)
The Origin and Decline of Female Body Building (2011)
I Strip For God, Part 1 (2009)
It's Not Over Till the Fat Lady Sings: Mother God Strikes Back Against Misogyny (Featuring William Bond, et al.) (2006 and 2007)
Can Female Power Save the Planet? The Fate of the World Depends on Women (2006)

See also
William Bond
Female empowerment
Goddess movement
Matriarchy
Matriarchal religion
Thealogy

References

External links
Kellie Everts Website
Official website of Kellie Everts 'I Strip for God'
Mother God Church website
Embodiment of God
Kellie Everts at Internet Movie Database
Kellie Everts at Internet Adult Film Database
"The Life and Times of Rasa Von Werder", Binghamton University Pipe Dream, March 18, 2016
Interview with David Robson, 2019.

American feminist writers
1945 births
Living people
German emigrants to the United States
German female erotic dancers
American people of Lithuanian descent
Professional bodybuilders
Sportspeople from Binghamton, New York
People from Calw